Under the Covers is a Canadian radio program, airing on CBC Radio One as a summer series in 2007 and 2008. Cohosted by musicians Emm Gryner and Danny Michel, the program plays and discusses classic musical covers.

Under the Covers is also a radio show that has been airing for 8 years on INDI 101 in Hamilton, Ontario previously known as C101.5FM.

External links
 Under the Covers

CBC Radio One programs
2007 radio programme debuts